Ants Taul (born 7 March 1950 in Tõrva) is an Estonian musician and instrument-maker who played a prominent role in the revival of the Estonian bagpipe, the torupill. As early as 1976 (when he was 26), Taul was recognised as one of Estonia's primary bagpipers, with piper Olev Roomet having retired due to ill health.

Taul continued to play, including representing Estonia in musical exhibitions with other folk musicians in the 1980s.

Ants' son, Andrus, continues to make and play the torupill as had his father.

Discography
Estonie: Airs Anciennes. Ocora France, 2000. ASIN: B00004SRI5
Gajdy and Bock / Goat and Billygoat: Bagpipes from Central Europe. PAN Records, 2008. ASIN: B003T8P4UQ

External links
Estonian Bagpipe by Ants' son, pipemaker Andrus Taul
The Estonian Bagpipe, Igor Tonurist (1974?)

References

Estonian musicians
Torupill players
Bagpipe makers
1950 births
Living people
20th-century Estonian musicians
21st-century Estonian musicians
Recipients of the Order of the White Star, 4th Class
People from Tõrva